Gerry Royce Blakes (born November 16, 1993) is an American professional basketball player who plays for MKS Dąbrowa Górnicza of the Polish Basketball League. He played college basketball for Arizona State.

Early life and high school
Blakes was born and raised in Inglewood, California and began high school at Leuzinger High School. At Leuzinger, Blakes was a teammate of future NBA point guard Delon Wright and came off the bench to help the Olympians win the California state championship in his junior season. He transferred to Morningside High School before his senior year.

College career

San Bernardino Valley College
Blakes played his first two seasons at San Bernardino Valley College and was named the Foothill Conference Most Valuable Player both years and the California Community College Athletic Association co-Player of the Year as a sophomore after averaging 23.7 points per game.

Arizona State
Blakes played his final two seasons for the Arizona State Sun Devils. In his first season at Arizona State, Blakes started all but one of the Sun Devils' games and was second on the team with 11.2 points per game. He played in 66 games (62 starts) and averaged 11.1 points, 4.8 rebounds, and 2.1 assists per game.

Professional career

Enosis Neon Paralimni
Blakes signed with Enosis Neon Paralimni B.C. of Cyprus Basketball Division A on October 12, 2016. He averaged 14.3 points, 6.2 rebounds (5th in the league), 3.1 assists and 1.5 steals over 20 games during the 2016–17 season.

Norrköping Dolphins
Blakes signed with the Norrköping Dolphins of the Swedish Basketligan on July 3, 2017. He averages 16.1 points, 7.5 rebounds, 3.0 assists and 1.1 steals in 40 games with Norrköping  and was named EuroBasket All-Swedish Basketligan 1st Team.

Pallacanestro Cantù
Blakes signed with the Pallacanestro Cantù the Lega Basket Serie A (LBA) on July 16, 2018. Blakes averaged 12.3 points, 3.5 rebounds and 2.9 assists in 30 LBA games (seven starts) and 19.0 points, 3.8 rebounds, 4.8 assists, and 1.5 steals in four Champions League games.

Oldenburg
Blakes signed with EWE Baskets Oldenburg of the German Basketball Bundesliga (BBL) on June 20, 2019. Blakes averaged 10.4 points, 2.0 rebounds, 2.1 assists and 1.2 steals per game in nine BBL games and 12.3 points, 2.3 rebounds and 2.1 assists in ten EuroCup games before leaving the team in February 2020.

Strasbourg
Blakes signed with SIG Strasbourg of the French LNB Pro A on February 21, 2020. In one game, he had 16 points, 6 rebounds and an assist.

Cholet Basket
On July 24, 2020, he has signed with Brose Bamberg of the Basketball Bundesliga (BBL). On October 5, 2020, his contract with the team was terminated before playing in any competitive game. He signed with Cholet Basket of the LNB Pro A on October 29.

Limoges CSP
On August 2, 2021, Blakes signed with Limoges CSP.

VEF Rīga
On July 20, 2022, he has signed with VEF Rīga of the Latvian-Estonian Basketball League.

References

External links
Arizona State Sun Devils bio
College Statistics at Sports-Reference.com
RealGM.com profile
EuroBasket Profile

1993 births
Living people
21st-century African-American sportspeople
African-American basketball players
American expatriate basketball people in Cyprus
American expatriate basketball people in France
American expatriate basketball people in Germany
American expatriate basketball people in Italy
American expatriate basketball people in Sweden
American men's basketball players
Arizona State Sun Devils men's basketball players
Basketball players from Inglewood, California
EWE Baskets Oldenburg players
Lega Basket Serie A players
Limoges CSP players
Norrköping Dolphins players
Pallacanestro Cantù players
Point guards
Shooting guards